Tathiana Garbin and Tina Križan were the defending champions, but Križan decided to play at the 2006 Medibank International instead, which was held during the same week. Garbin played with Emmanuelle Gagliardi, but the team lost in the semifinals.

Marta Domachowska and Roberta Vinci won the title, defeating Claire Curran and Līga Dekmeijere in the final in straight sets.

Seeds

Draw

Draw

Qualifying

Seeds

Qualifiers
  Sofia Arvidsson /  Sybille Bammer

Qualifying draw

References
 Main and Qualifying Draws
 2006 Sydney, Canberra & Hobart WTA Singles Results Henin-Hardenne, Medina Garrigues & Krajicek, Champs

2006 WTA Tour
Canberra International
Tennis tournaments in Australia
2006 in Australian tennis